Mahi Kantha was a political agency or collection of princely states in British India, within the Gujarat Division of Bombay Presidency. In 1933, the states of the Mahi Kantha Agency, except for Danta, were included in the Western India States Agency.

History 
The states came within the British sphere of influence after the Second Anglo-Maratha War of 1803–1805. In 1811, when the Maratha power was declining, the British Government stipulated to collect and pay over to the ruler of Baroda the yearly tribute of the Mahi Kantha states. In 1820 they finally took over the management of the whole territory, agreeing to collect and pay over the tribute free of expense to Baroda, while Baroda was pledged not to send troops into the country, or in any way to interfere with the administration. After a few disturbances in the 1830s, in 1857-58 and 1867, peace remained unbroken in the region until 1881, when the Bhils of Pol rose against their chief and extorted from him a settlement of their claims.

The famine of 1899–1900 was severely felt in Mahi Kantha, and the population of the agency decreased by 38% in the decade 1891–1901 due to famine. Many of the inhabitants were Bhils and Kolis. In 1897 a metre-gauge railway was opened from Ahmedabad through Parantij to Moyad, Vagpur, Sitwada , jagiri Rathod near Ambliara State to Ahmednagar. At Sadra was the Scott College for the education of the sons of rulers on the lines of a British public school. There were also English language schools at Sadra, Idar and Mansa.

Successor jurisdictions 
In 1933 the agencies of Mahi Kantha and Banas Kantha, known as Palanpur Agency until 1925, were merged. However Palanpur State was transferred to the Rajputana Agency and was thus not part of the newly created agency.

After the independence of India in 1947, the rulers of the Mahi Kantha states acceded to the Government of India, and the area was reorganized into districts of Bombay State. In 1960, Bombay State was split along linguistic lines, and the area of Mahi Kantha became part of the new state of Gujarat.

List of Princely States 

The states were classified in the following manner:

Salute states

First Class state 
 Idar (styled (Maha)Raja), a 15-guns salute state, covering over half of the territory of the agency.

Second Class state 
 Danta (styled Maharana), an 11-guns salute state

Non-Salute states

Third Class states 
 Malpur
 Mansa
 Mohanpur

Fourth Class states 
 Ilol
 Ghodasar
 Katosan
 Khadal
 Pethapur
 Vallbhapur
 Ranasan
 Sudasna
 Varsoda
 Ambliara
 Antroli
 Moyad
 Vaghpur

Fifth Class states 

 Aglode
 Dabha
 Dadhalia
 Ged
 Magodi
 Rupal
 Sathamba
 Tunadar
 Valasna
 Vasna (Wasna)
 Wadagam

Sixth Class states 

Bhalusna
Bolundra
 Dedhrota
Derol
 Hadol
Hapa
Kadoli
Khedwada
Likhi
 Prempur
Ramas
Satlasna
Tajpuri
Vakhtapur

Seventh Class states 
Deloli
Gabat
Ijpura
Kasalpura
Mahmadpura
Palaj
Rampura
Ranipura
Tejpuri
Timba
Umri
Virsoda

Estates 
The agency included as well a large number of estates belonging to Rajput or Kolis formerly feudatories of Baroda; several of the states paid tribute to Baroda, and some, being classed as non-jurisdictional thalukdars, were under British administration.

References 

History of Gujarat
Agencies of British India
Bombay Presidency
1947 disestablishments in India